Juan Diéguez Olaverri  (1813–1866) was a Guatemalan writer.

References
This article was initially translated from the Spanish Wikipedia.

1813 births
1866 deaths
Guatemalan male writers
Date of birth missing